Dorothy Dwan (April 26, 1906 – March 17, 1981) was an American film actress.

Biography
Born  Dorothy Ilgenfritz in Sedalia, Missouri, Dwan was a WAMPAS Baby Star. She appeared in 40 films between 1922 and 1930, several of which were directed by her second husband, Larry Semon.

In 1928, Dwan moved from making films to acting on stage, signing with Henry Duffy to act in his Pacific Coast theaters.

Dwan married three times. She had one child, a son, Paul, from her third marriage to Paul Northcutt Boggs Jr. Dwan died in Ventura, California from lung cancer, aged 74.

Partial filmography

 The Silent Vow (1922)
 The Enemy Sex (1924)
 Her Boy Friend (1924)
 Breed of the Border (1924)
 Kid Speed (1924)
 The Parasite (1925)
 Wizard of Oz (1925)
 The Perfect Clown (1925)
 Bashful Buccaneer (1925)
 Stop, Look and Listen (1926)
 The Great K & A Train Robbery (1926)
 The Call of the Klondike (1926)
 A Captain's Courage (1926)
 The Dangerous Dude (1926)
 Hills of Kentucky (1927)
 Tumbling River (1927)
 The Land Beyond the Law (1927)
 Spuds (1927)
 The Princess on Broadway (1927)
 Silver Valley (1927)
 Riders of the Dark (1928)
 Square Crooks (1928)
 Out with the Tide (1928)
 The Drifter (1929)
 The Peacock Fan (1929)
 The California Mail (1929)
 The Fighting Legion (1930)

References

External links

Dorothy Dwan at Virtual History

1906 births
1981 deaths
American film actresses
American silent film actresses
People from Sedalia, Missouri
Actresses from Missouri
Deaths from lung cancer in California
20th-century American actresses
Western (genre) film actresses